Voice of the Free is a non-profit, non-stock, and tax-exempt non-government organization in the Philippines established in 1991. Voice of the Free (VF) works for the welfare of marginalized migrants, especially those working in the invisible and informal sectors. It works in issues of domestic work, child labor, and human trafficking- especially of women and children.

Overview
Voice of the Free is licensed and accredited by the Department of Social Welfare and Development (DSWD) to provide "residential care and community-based programs and services for women and children in especially difficult circumstances."
It is most known for its pioneering and documented work with domestic workers in the Philippines, especially in pushing for the Domestic Workers Bill or the Batas Kasambahay. It is also in the forefront of providing services to trafficking victims by managing Halfway Houses constructed by the Philippine Ports Authority and the Manila International Airport Authority in major Philippine ports.

VF's work for child domestic workers has been cited by ILO-IPEC and the United Nations Girls Education Initiative (UNGEI) as one of the international best practices. Its anti-trafficking partnership with the Philippine government and private shipping companies was also hailed as one of the international best practices by the U.S. State Department in its 2005 Trafficking in Persons (TIP) Report. The Anti-Slavery International, the world's oldest human rights organization, also conferred the 2005 Anti-Slavery award on VF's president.

In September 2012, the organization's leaders were accused of fraud. In December 2016 the Visayan Forum was cleared by the Department of Justice from the allegation.

History
Voice of the Free was founded in 1991 by Maria Cecilia Flores-Obanda as the Visayan Forum Foundation Inc. (VFF), a nonprofit organization. Based in Quezon City, the Voice of the Free has rescued and helped more than 32,000 victims and potential victims of trafficking.

These days the Visayan Forum now has its own national office in Manila — plus a network of over 70 staff workers, six regional offices, and seven project areas.

National and International Efforts in Mobilizing Social Partners
 Philippine and Southeast Asian Secretariat, Global March against Child Labor
 Convenor, Task Force on Child Domestic Workers in Asia
 Convenor, Multi-Sectoral Network against Trafficking in Persons (MSNAT)
 Convenor, Anti-Trafficking Task Forces at the Ports
 Vice-chair, Philippine NGO Coalition on the UNCRC
 Member, ILO Convention 182 National Monitoring Team
 Member, National Steering Committee of UNICEF's Sixth Country Program for Children

Mission
To contribute to the protection, freedom and empowerment of marginalized migrants, especially Filipino women and children, by:

 Mobilizing local, national and international efforts that promote safe migration and work for the development of marginalized migrants, especially the invisible domestic workers and trafficked women and children.
 Providing integrative services and interventions
 Campaigning, capacity-building and organizing advocates and volunteers as agents of change towards policies and programs that sustain long-term development involving women and children, communities, and other social partners.
 Leading and sustaining preventive and proactive community-based programs

Goals
Institutionalized local, national and international policies that shall protect and provide programs and services for women and children especially the mainstreaming of domestic workers and trafficked persons.
Sustained networks, partners, support or survivor groups and other stakeholders to provide protection, justice and developmental opportunities for long-term implementation of programs and services to victims of trafficking, abusive domestic work, as well as other vulnerable groups.
Interventions for victims of trafficking and abusive domestic work are set up and strengthened in strategic areas, ports and hotspots.
Communities are economically viable and secured.

Projects
VF has strategically located its shelters and project areas along the known trafficking routes by partnering with private sector and transport authorities to guard ports and airports. Dubbed "Balay Silungan sa Daungan" (Home Shelter at the Port) and "Bahay Silungan sa Paliparan" (Home Shelter at the Airport), the shelters provides 24-hour "safety and catchment" services for victims of trafficking intercepted by child rights advocates and government personnel.

The centers, jointly established by the Visayan Forum Foundation (VF) and the MIAA (BSP) and PPA (BSD), also provides victims of child trafficking a temporary shelter, referrals in pursuing legal actions against their recruiters and telephone hotline counseling. VF-Mindanao regional coordinator, Luzviminda Panes, said the center also provides mechanisms to protect children who travel alone or are stranded at the seaport.

Human trafficking
Visayan Forum Foundation has been involved in helping women and children trafficked into prostitution by providing support, education, housing, and legal advice.
Visayan Forum Foundation has established that most of the children and young women trafficked to Manila from rural areas in search of work are assured jobs as domestic workers, but in a significant number of cases end up in the sex trade. Based on the statistics provided by the Visayan Forum Foundation, most victims are between 12 and 22 years old.

The Visayan Forum work with the Philippine coast guard, the government's Port Authority, and shipping company, Aboitez, to keep monitor arriving boats in the main ports, looking for possible traffickers traveling with groups of children.
The organization has operations in four main ports serving Manila, and says it rescues between 20 and 60 children a week.

Regional Centers
Metro Manila, Batangas, Bacolod, Davao, Sorsogon.

Other Project Areas
NCR, Batangas, Sorsogon, Cebu, Iloilo, Negros Occidental, Negros Oriental, Davao, Southern Leyte, Samar, Surigao, and Zamboanga.

Awards
Maria Cecilia Flores-Oebanda of the Visayan Forum Foundation is the first person to win the Iqbal Masih Award for the Elimination of Child Labor, a new honor bestowed by the U.S. Department of Labor.
Maria Cecilia Flores-Oebanda was presented with the award by Kristie Kenny, the U.S. ambassador to the Philippines.

In 2005, Maria Cecilia Flores-Oebanda of the Visayan Forum Foundation received the Anti-Slavery Award from Anti-Slavery International, the world's oldest human rights organization.

In 2009, the Visayan Forum Foundation was awarded the Eduardo Aboitiz Award for Outstanding Institution.

Department of Justice Resolution

The Department of Justice issued July 29, 2016, a resolution dismissing and clearing Visayan Forum Foundation Officers and key staff on charges of Estafa through Falsification of Commercial documents filed by the NBI in connection with a USAID grant.

The four-page decision signed on July 29, 2016, by Senior Assistant State Prosecutor Merba A. Waga, Senior Deputy State Prosecutor Theodore M. Villanueva, and approved by Prosecutor General Claro A. Arellano, stated that there was insufficient evidence to even warrant the conduct of a further preliminary investigation.

In August 2012, the NBI probed the foundation for allegedly falsifying documents to hide the misuse of at least $2.1 Million USAID grant for the organization's pioneering anti-trafficking work. 
 
"I'm thankful to DOJ that after more than four years of patiently and humbly waiting to allow the justice system to take its course, we can put this allegation behind us. We thank our partners who stood with us during those difficult times. We can now move forward and focus our positive energies to fulfill our greater mission. As of now there are 50 victims and survivors of human trafficking as young as 2 years old under our care in the center of Visayan Forum, they are most important to us." Ma. Cecilia Flores-Oebanda. Visayan Forum Founding President said.

According, to the resolution "thus, it is clear that the alleged falsified documents which were purportedly used as supporting documents to liquidate the funds they claimed VFFI received from the USAID and made the basis of their complaint cannot support the charges filed against the herein respondents.  There is no gainsaying that the complaint filed against the herein respondents has no leg to stand on."

References

External links
Visayan Forum Foundation - archived copy of official website (original no longer available)
Anti-Slavery Award

Foundations based in the Philippines
Social welfare charities
Workers' rights organizations
Child labour-related organizations
Women's rights organizations
Organizations that combat human trafficking
Organizations established in 1991
Labor in the Philippines
Human trafficking in the Philippines
1991 establishments in the Philippines